Fever Pitch is a 1985 American drama film written and directed by Richard Brooks and starring Ryan O'Neal, Giancarlo Giannini, Chad Everett, John Saxon, and Catherine Hicks. The film marked Brooks's final film before his death in 1992. The original score was composed by Thomas Dolby.

Fever Pitch failed at the box office, grossing just over $600,000 on a budget of $7 million. It was nominated for four Razzie Awards, including Worst Picture, as well as contributing to O'Neal's later Razzie nomination for Worst Actor of the Decade. The film is listed in Golden Raspberry Award founder John J. B. Wilson's book The Official Razzie Movie Guide as one of the "100 Most Enjoyably Bad Movies Ever Made".

Plot
Sports writer Steve Taggart (O'Neal) volunteers to do a series of articles for the Los Angeles Herald Examiner about a compulsive sports and casino gambler he calls "Mr. Green" who is, in fact, himself. His sports editor, John Saxon, enthusiastically assigns Taggart the sports betting and casino gambling series, which soon attracts a large readership interest.

Over time, Taggart becomes more obsessed with gambling in Las Vegas, which lands him even more deeply in debt. He compounds his money and gambling problems by dealing with associated loan sharks, including the mean and dangerous L.A. bookmaker known as "The Dutchman" (Chad Everett). Taggart soon learns that even a L.A. pro football quarterback, whose football team he covers, is also on the Dutchman's payroll - as a means of cutting his own sports gambling debts. After clearing the story further with his sports editor (John Saxon), Taggart journeys to Las Vegas for a field report on his gambling series; he meets a newspaper publisher, who helps him make more gambling industry contacts. Through the MGM casino executive, Mr. Sweeney Keith Hefner, Taggart meets a sexy casino cocktail hostess named Flo (Catherine Hicks). Flo is sent to Taggart's hotel room for a night, but Taggart, loving the gaming tables, with Flo as his 'lucky charm', goes gambling at the Dunes Hotel casino. Taggart gambles with Flo at roulette, and wins. Taggart, as part of his on going news story, also checks out assorted Las Vegas bookmakers, including Leroy's. Taggart meets various Vegas gambling and business figures, including famed Las Vegas Sun publisher Hank Greenspun, for more insights into the Las Vegas gambling world. He is unaware that the Dutchman's tough guy enforcer, "Panama Hat" (William Smith), is following him, until "The Hat" confronts him at the hotel pool, as Taggart attempts to relax on a chaise longue. Panama Hat forcefully orders Taggart to return to Los Angeles immediately, and settle up with the Dutchman, or there will be dire consequences.

Taggart's risk-addiction and perennial gambling money-losses ultimately spill over into his personal life. After a day trip to Knott's Berry Farm, Taggart brings his young daughter (Bridgette Andersen) to Hollywood Park; at the track pressbox, they chat with his colleagues, including famed Los Angeles newspaper sportswriters, the L.A. Times Jim Murray and the L.A. Herald Examiner's Alan Malamud. Taggart, while trying to stem his gambling while at the racetrack, is physically assaulted by a track-goer to whom he owes money. Reporting to work the next day at the Herald Examiner, his editor says he loves the "Mr. Green" series, and foolishly advances Taggart $10,000 dollars for "Mr. Green" to use as seed money for more gambling.

Upon more reflection on how truly dangerous sports gambling can be, Taggart visits Gamblers Anonymous in order to end his gambling compulsion. Taggart still returns to Las Vegas, where he becomes increasingly acquainted with high-roller Charley Peru (Giancarlo Giannini), in hopes of making a large score and breaking even. He also hopes Peru can help him get Panama Hat off Taggart's back. After attending the Gambler's Anonymous meeting, Taggart soon decides to stop gambling "forever".

Before returning to Los Angeles, to celebrate "kicking" his gambling habit, Taggart places a few dollars into a slot machine at the Las Vegas Airport, where he magically scores a huge jackpot. Taggart immediately gets an attorney to hold the huge cash score in trust fund for his daughter. When he asks the attorney to reassure him, that "even I cannot touch the money?", his attorney firmly replies, "especially, not you."

Cast
 Ryan O'Neal as Steve Taggart
 Catherine Hicks as Flo
 Giancarlo Giannini as Charley
 Bridgette Andersen as Amy
 Chad Everett as The Dutchman
 John Saxon as The Sports Editor
 Hank Greenspun as The Las Vegas Sun Publisher
 William Smith as "Panama Hat"
 Keith Hefner as Sweeney
 Patrick Cassidy as Soldier
 William Prince as Mitchell
 Chad McQueen as Convict
 Fred Robledo as The Sports Desk Editor

Production
Richard Brooks became interested in the problem of gambling in America while recovering from a heart attack in 1983. He began researching the topic and wrote the script over two years. It was originally to be produced by Dino de Laurentiis under the title The Fever and Brooks wanted Sam Shepard to play the lead.  Jack Nicholson, Al Pacino and Tom Selleck were also considered for the role. De Laurentiis dropped out and Ryan O'Neal was cast instead. Filming took place from October 1984 to January 1985 and Brooks spent nine months editing it.

The newspaper editorial office scenes were all filmed at the Los Angeles Herald Examiner, which always had a popular horse racing page, and solid sports gambling coverage. Many Herald Examiner and Los Angeles Times staffers had bit parts in the movie.

See also
 List of films set in Las Vegas

References

External links
 
 
 
 

1985 films
1985 drama films
American drama films
Films directed by Richard Brooks
Films set in the Las Vegas Valley
Films about gambling
Metro-Goldwyn-Mayer films
1980s English-language films
1980s American films
English-language drama films

ca:Fever Pitch